"Belinda" is a 1981 music recording by the British new wave duo Eurythmics. It was the band's second single, and the second of two singles to be taken from their debut album In the Garden.

Background
The single, which was released only in the UK, was not a commercial success and failed to chart. No music video was made for the single.

The song was co-produced by Conny Plank and featured members of Can, and also Robert Görl of D.A.F.

The B-side, "Heartbeat, Heartbeat" was exclusive to this single, though it was later included on the remastered version of In The Garden in 2005.

Personnel

"Belinda"
Ann Lennox: vocals, keyboards
Dave Stewart: guitars,  bass guitar 
Robert Görl (of D.A.F.): drums
Holger Czukay (of Can): French horn

"Heartbeat, Heartbeat"
Ann Lennox: vocals 
Dave Stewart: guitars, bass guitar  
Jürgen Zeltinger: heart attack
Robert Görl: drums  
Jaki Liebezeit, Holgar Czukay, Marcus Stockhausen: brass

UK 7":  A. Belinda (LP Version)  4:01     B: Heartbeat Heartbeat (Non-LP Track)  2:06

Eurythmics songs
1981 singles
RCA Records singles
1981 songs
Songs written by Annie Lennox
Songs written by David A. Stewart